Kenneth Bruce Mason AM (September 4, 1928 - December 20, 2018) was an Anglican bishop in Australia.

Mason was educated at the University of Queensland and ordained in 1953. His first position was as a curate at Gilgandra. He then held incumbencies at Darwin and Alice Springs. From 1965 to 1968 he was Dean of Trinity College, Melbourne. As a professed member of the Brotherhood of the Good Shepherd, Mason was known as "Brother Aiden" until his consecration as a bishop. On 24 February 1968, at St John's Cathedral (Brisbane), he was consecrated to the episcopate to serve as the Bishop of the Northern Territory, a position he held until 1983. From 1983 to 1993 Mason was chairman of the Australian Board of Missions (now called the Anglican Board of Mission - Australia).

In retirement, Mason regularly attended St James' Church, Sydney, where a Requiem Eucharist was held for him on 19 January 2019.

References 

1928 births
2018 deaths
University of Queensland alumni
20th-century Anglican bishops in Australia
Anglican bishops of the Northern Territory
Members of the Order of Australia
Bush Brotherhood priests